HMS Hebe was one of 21 s built for the Royal Navy in the 1930s. Commissioned in 1936, Hebe served during World War II, notably taking part in the Dunkirk evacuation in 1940 and then serving in the Mediterranean, carrying out minesweeping operations from Malta. After taking part in several operations, including Operations Harpoon and Torch, and the invasion of Pantelleria, Hebe was sunk by a mine off Bari in November 1943, with the loss of 37 of the vessel's crew.

Design and description
The Halcyon class was designed as a replacement for the preceding Hunt class and varied in size and propulsion. The ship's complement consisted of 80 officers and ratings.

She was powered by two Parsons geared steam turbines, each driving one shaft, using steam provided by two Admiralty three-drum boilers.

Hebe was armed with two QF 4-inch (10.2 cm) anti-aircraft guns. She was also equipped with eight  machine guns. Later in her career, the rear 4-inch gun mount was removed as were most of the .303 machine guns, while one quadruple mount for Vickers .50 machine guns was added as were up to four single or twin mounts for 20 mm Oerlikon antiaircraft guns. For anti-submarine escort, her minesweeping gear could be exchanged for around 40 depth charges.

Construction and career
Hebe was built at the Devonport Dockyard, being laid down on laid down on 27 April 1936. She was launched on 28 October 1936 and she was commissioned in 1937. Her pennant number was N 24, later J 24. The ship served during the evacuation of Dunkirk, where she rescued 365 officers and men, and sent a gig to rescue Lord Gort on 29 May 1940. She later saw service in the Mediterranean Sea based at Malta as part of 14th/17th Minesweeper Flotilla. She participated in Operation Harpoon (where she was hit and extensively damaged by a very long range 152 mm shell shot fired by the Italian cruiser  ), Operation Torch, and the invasion of Pantelleria. She was sunk by a mine off Bari on 22 November 1943. Thirty-seven men from her complement were lost with the ship.

References

Bibliography

External links
 HMS Hebe J 24
 Minesweeping at Malta

 

Halcyon-class minesweepers
Ships built in Plymouth, Devon
1936 ships
World War II minesweepers of the United Kingdom
World War II shipwrecks in the Mediterranean Sea
Maritime incidents in November 1943
Ships sunk by mines